7β-Hydroxydehydroepiandrosterone (7β-hydroxy-DHEA; 7β-OH-DHEA), also known as 3β,7β-dihydroxyandrost-5-ene-17-one, is an endogenous, naturally occurring steroid and a metabolite of dehydroepiandrosterone (DHEA). The major metabolic pathway of DHEA outside the liver is via 7-hydroxylation into 7α-OH-DHEA and 7β-OH-DHEA. 7β-OH-DHEA has weak antiestrogenic activity, selectively antagonizing the estrogen receptor ERβ.

7β-OH-DHEA is on the World Anti-Doping Agency list of prohibited substances in sporting.

See also
 7-Keto-DHEA
 7α-Hydroxyepiandrosterone
 7β-Hydroxyepiandrosterone

References

Diols
Androstanes
Antiestrogens
Ketones
World Anti-Doping Agency prohibited substances